Novoznamenka is a rural locality (a selo) in Oktyabrsky Selsoviet, Kulundinsky District, Altai Krai, Russia. The population was 32 as of 2013. There are 3 streets.

Geography 
Novoznamenka is located 25 km west of Kulunda (the district's administrative centre) by road. Orlovka is the nearest rural locality.

References 

Rural localities in Kulundinsky District